Alcide Moodie "Cid" LaNoue (November 2, 1934 – February 20, 2021) was a lieutenant general in the United States Army. He was Surgeon General of the United States Army from September 1992 to September 1996. He attended The Medical Field Service School and the United States Army Command and General Staff College. He was also an alumnus of Harvard College with a B.A. degree in chemistry in 1956 and the Yale School of Medicine with his M.D. degree in 1960. Commissioned in 1957, he was an orthopedic surgeon. Prior to his stint as Surgeon General, LaNoue was Commander of the Eisenhower Army Medical Center, Commandant of the United States Army Academy of Health Sciences, Deputy Surgeon General of the Army, and Commanding General of the United States Army Health Services Command.

His awards include the Distinguished Service Medal (with Oak Leaf Cluster), Legion of Merit (with Oak Leaf Cluster), Bronze Star Medal and Meritorious Service Medal (with 3 Oak Leaf Clusters).

After his death in 2021, LaNoue was interred at Florida National Cemetery.

References

1934 births
2021 deaths
People from Tonawanda, New York
Harvard College alumni
Yale School of Medicine alumni
Physicians from New York (state)
Military personnel from New York (state)
United States Army personnel of the Vietnam War
Recipients of the Meritorious Service Medal (United States)
Recipients of the Legion of Merit
United States Army generals
Recipients of the Distinguished Service Medal (US Army)
Surgeons General of the United States Army
People from Tampa, Florida
Burials at Florida National Cemetery